Wadebridge Town Football Club is a football club based in Wadebridge, Cornwall, England, in the UK. The club is affiliated to the Cornwall County Football Association.

History

They were established in 1894 and joined the South Western League for its second season in 1952 and remained in membership until 2007 when they became founder members of the South West Peninsula League Division One West. During their time in the South Western League they had never won the league title, but on three occasions had finished in the runner-up spot. In their first season in the South West Peninsula league the club gained promotion to the Premier Division as champions. The club remained in the Premier Division until the end of the 2010–11 season when the finished bottom of the Premier division and were relegated back to Division One west.

They have competed in all three of the main national competitions, without any major success. The club has reached the third qualifying round of the FA Cup three times, the last being over thirty years ago, and prior to being accepted for the 2006–07 season, they hadn't been played in the tournament since 1984–85. They were among the teams selected for the first FA Trophy competition in 1969–70, but in six seasons never progressed past the qualifying rounds, and in a similar number of entries in the FA Vase their best run was to the third round in 1982–83.

Ground

Wadebridge Town play their games at Bodieve Park, Wadebridge PL27 6DJ. They have played at this ground since 1949.

The ground has seen a number of major improvements in recent years, with a new grandstand to replace the original wooden one, the installation of floodlights in 2004, and most recently, a project to reduce the slope of the pitch.  In late 2006, however, the club applied for outline planning permission to build offices on their existing ground and to build a new pitch, to be shared with Wadebridge School.

Honours

League honours
South Western League
Runners-up (3): 1968–69, 1978–79, 1979–80
South West Peninsula League Division One West
Champions (1): 2007–08

Cup honours
South West Peninsula League Charity Vase
Winners (1): 2007–08

Records

Highest League Position: 2nd in South Western League 1968–69, 1978–79, 1979–80
FA Cup best performance: Third qualifying round 1958–59, 1968–69, 1969–70, 1971–72
FA Trophy best performance: Third qualifying round 1970–71
FA Vase best performance: Third round 1982–83

Former players
 Players that have played/managed in the football league or any foreign equivalent to this level (i.e. fully professional league).
 Players with full international caps.
John Brown
Reg Wyatt

References

External links
 The Official homepage of Wadebridge Town F.C

Football clubs in Cornwall
Football clubs in England
South West Peninsula League
Association football clubs established in 1894
1894 establishments in England
Wadebridge